The members of the 4th Manitoba Legislature were elected in the Manitoba general election held in December 1879. The legislature sat from January 22, 1880, to November 13, 1882.

Premier John Norquay formed a majority government. There appears to have been some debate at the time of this election whether or not candidates were running for election based on party lines.

Thomas Greenway was Leader of the Opposition.

John Wright Sifton served as speaker for the assembly.

There were four sessions of the 4th Legislature:

Joseph-Édouard Cauchon was Lieutenant Governor of Manitoba until September 29, 1882, when James Cox Aikins became lieutenant governor.

Members of the Assembly 
The following members were elected to the assembly in 1879:

Notes:

By-elections 
By-elections were held to replace members for various reasons:

Notes:

References 

Terms of the Manitoba Legislature
1880 establishments in Manitoba
1882 disestablishments in Manitoba